Spitting Image is a 1984–1996 British satirical television puppet show.

Spitting Image or The Spitting Image may also refer to:

 Spitting Image (2020 TV series), a revival of the original series
 Spitting Image (video game), a 1989 fighting game featuring the puppet show
 Spitting Image (album), by the Strypes, 2017
 The Spitting Image, a 1998 book by Jerry Lembcke
 Spitting Image, a 1968 stage play by Colin Spencer
 "Spitting Image", an episode of Mona the Vampire
 , a chapter of Japanese serialized manga One Piece
 "Spitting Image", a song by Megaherz off the 2008 album Heuchler
 a doppelganger, a spitting image

See also

 Image (disambiguation)
 Spit (disambiguation)